{{Infobox religious biography
| honorific-prefix = Sant Shiromani Acharya Shri 108
| name = Vidyasagar
| honorific-suffix = Ji Maharaj
| image = Acharya5 (cropped).jpg
| alt = VIDHYADHAR
| caption = Acharya Shri Vidyasagar Ji a prominent Digambara monk
| religion = Jainism
| sect = Digambara
| birth_name = Vidyadhar
| birth_date = 
| birth_place = Sadalga, Belgaum district, Karnataka
| father = Mallappa (name after diksha-Mallinath ji)
| mother = Shrimanti(name after diksha-Samaymati Ji)
| initiation_date = 30 June 1968
| initiation_place = Ajmer
| initiator = Acharya Gyansagar
| predecessor = muni"Gyansagar
| disciples = Pramansagar, Sudhasagar, Kshamasagar, Guptisagar
| works = Mukamati (silent soil)
| website = 
}}

Acharya Shri Vidyasagarji Maharaj (born 10 October 1946) is a Digambara Jain Acharya (Digambar Jain Monk) in present time. He is recognized both for his scholarship and tapasya (austerity). He is known for his long hours in meditation. While he was born in Karnataka and took diksha (undertook spiritual discipline) in Rajasthan, he generally spends much of his time in the Bundelkhand region where he is credited with having brought about a revival in educational and religious activities. He has written haiku poems and the epic Hindi poem "Mukamati".

Life
Early life

Vidyasagar was born on 10 October 1946 during the full moon festival (Sharad Purnima) in Sadalga, in the Belgaum district, of Karnataka in a Kannada speaking Jain family. The modest house where he was born, is now a temple and a museum.

His childhood name was Vidyadhar. He was the second of four sons, the eldest son being Mahavira Ashtage. As a child, he was fond of eating fresh butter which was used to make ghee (clarified butter). He was not a demanding child and accepted what was given to him. Vidyadhar used to visit temples and teach his younger siblings the principles of religion. He called both younger sisters "Akka" (elder sister). He was attentive and was eager to undertake his studies. In his spare time he used to paint.

Initiation
He was initiated as a Digambara monk in 1968 at the age of 22 by Acharya Gyansagar, who belonged to the lineage of Acharya Shantisagar, at Ajmer. His father Mallappa, his mother Shrimati, and two sisters took diksha and joined the sangha (community of the pious) of Acharya Dharmasagar. Except for his eldest brother, his remaining brothers, Anantanath and Shantinath, followed him and were initiated by Acharya Vidyasagar as Muni Yogasagar and Muni Samaysagar respectively. His elder brother married and continued the blood line.

He was elevated to the Acharya status in 1972. An Acharya does not eat salt, sugar, fruits, milk, oil, ghee, in addition to what is traditionally prohibited (like onions). He goes out for a meal at about 9:30 a.m.–10:00 a.m. from Śrāvakas (lay votaries). He takes food once a day in the palm of his hand, one morsel at a time.

In 1999, then Prime Minister Atal Bihari Vajpayee paid a visit to Acharya Ji during his visit to  Gomatgiri Indore.

Acharya Vidyasagar's Chaturmas (four-month stay) in 2016 was in Bhopal, Madhya Pradesh, where he was accompanied by 38 munis. He gave his Pravachana (reading) in the Madhya Pradesh Legislative Assembly by special invitation from Chief Minister Shivraj Singh Chouhan on 28 July 2016. In 2016, during a trip to Bhopal, Prime Minister Narendra Modi visited him. He was also visited by former Union minister Jyotiraditya Scindia from the opposing Congress Party, now in BJP.

Congress State President Kamal Nath paid a visit to Acharya Ji during his visit to Jabalpur.

Union Minister Uma Bharati paid a visit to Acharya Ji at the completion of 50 years of initiation at the Samyama Swarna Mahotsav festival. During the Guru Purnima Celebration in 2018, Digvijay Singh received the blessings of Acharya Vidyasagar Ji in Chhatarpur, Madhya Pradesh. In 2018, American ambassador Kenneth Juster paid a visit to Acharya Vidyasagar Ji and assured him he would follow a full vegetarian diet for one day a week. French Diplomat Alexandre Ziegler visited Khajuraho with his family in 2018 and felt "peaceful and blessed" after meeting Acharya Vidyasagar Ji. He vowed to become a vegetarian.

Uttar Pradesh Chief Minister Yogi Adityanath has declared the State Guest Honour to Vidyasagar Ji Maharaj. In this regard, the UP Government also issued a protocol.

Union Home Minister Shri Rajnath Singh Ji has taken the blessings of Acharya Vidyasagar Ji in Jabalpur, Madhya Pradesh.

Lok Sabha Speaker Om Birla has taken the blessings of Acharya Vidyasagar Ji with an assurance of Hindi Promotion in Legislature.

RSS Chief Mohan Bhagwat paid a visit to Acharya Ji during his visit he discussed various topics related to Promotion of Hindi Language and handloom were discussed.

Madhya Pradesh CM Kamal Nath paid a visit to Acharya Ji and assured the promotion of Hindi Language, Ayurveda and handloom.

Works

 Acharya Vidyasagara is a scholar of Sanskrit and Prakrit and knows several languages including Hindi and Kannada. He has written in languages such as Prakrit, Sanskrit, Hindi. His works include Niranjana Shataka, Bhavana Shataka, Parishah Jaya Shataka, Suniti Shataka and Shramana Shataka. 
 He has composed nearly 700 haiku poems which are unpublished.
 He wrote the Hindi epic poem "Mukamati". This has been included in the syllabus of Hindi MA programmes at various institutions. This has been translated into English by  Lal Chandra Jain and was presented to Pratibha Patil, the President of India. Several researchers have studied his works for masters and doctoral degrees.

His tradition
Acharya Vidyasagar belongs to the tradition established by Acharya Shantisagar. Acharya Shantisagar initiated Acharya Virasagar, who was then succeeded by Acharya Shivsagar, Acharya Gyansagar and finally Acharya Vidyasagar.

Some of his disciples are well-known scholars in their own right. , about 21% of all the Digambar monks were under Acharya Vidyasagara. Muni Sudhasagar and Muni Pramansagar are also his disciples. One of his best known disciples, Muni Kshamasagar ji, obtained samadhi in 2015.

Acharya Pushadantasagar, the guru of Tarun Sagar was initiated as a kshullak (junior monk) by Acharya Vidyasagar, although he took muni diksha from Acharya Vimal Sagar. Upadhyaya Guptisagar took muni diksha in 1982 from Acharya Vidyasagar although he later joined the sangha (community) of Acharya Vidyanand.

Acharya Vidyasagar has been a source of inspiration to the people for founding institutions for their welfare at different locations. Since the number of monks (munis) and nuns (āryikas) initiated and directed by him exceeds two hundred (117 Digambar Muni, 172 Aryikas), they stay in more than 60 locations in India during Chaturmas, ranging from Gujarat to Jharkhand, and Haryana to Karnataka. This insures that only a few monks or nuns are staying in one place.

Acharya Shree Vidyasagar Maharaj of Digambar Muni tradition is the only Acharya of the country who has given 505 Muni, Aryika, Ailak, Kshulak initiations so far. The name of Acharyashree Kunthu Sagar Maharaj comes second, he has given 325 initiations so far.

His wanderings (Vihara)

As a traditional Digambara Jain monk, Acharya Vidyasagar never stays in a single location for more than a few days, except for the four months of the rainy season (Chaturmas). He never declares where he will be next, although people try to guess his next destination. Since his initiation in 1968 he has had: seven Chaturmas in Rajasthan (1968–74), one in Uttar Pradesh (1974), seven in Madhya Pradesh (1976–1982), one in Jharkhand (1983), nine in Madhya Pradesh again (1984–1992), two in Maharashtra (1993–94), one in Madhya Pradesh (1995), one in Gujarat (1996), 11 again in Madhya Pradesh (1997–2007), one again in Maharashtra (2008), eight again in Madhya Pradesh (2009–2016).

The fiftieth anniversary of his diksha was celebrated in many cities in India with parades and festivities in July 2018. On this occasion, commemorative columns (Swarna Kirti Stambha) were erected in Ajmer, संयम स्वर्ण कीर्ति स्तम्भ : Amazing Architecture : Jain Temple In Ajmer, Rajasthan India,  Jun 28, 2018 Rewa, Sravanbelgola and other locations.

Biography
His disciple Muni Kshamasagar wrote his biography Ātmānveśhī (hi:आत्मान्वेषी) which was translated into English as In Quest of the Self and was published by Bhartiya Jnanpith.

In popular culture
A documentary titled Vidyoday was released on 25 November 2018 by Landmark Films. A trailer was also released. The film is directed by Vidhi Kasliwal. Vidyoday'' had its first international screening at  the Harrow Safari Cinema in London.

See also 
 Jain philosophy
 List of Jains
 Ahimsa in Jainism

References

Notes

Sources

Further reading

External links 

 
 Official android app

1946 births
Living people
People from Belagavi district
Scholars from Karnataka
Digambara Acharyas
Indian Jain monks
20th-century Indian Jain writers
20th-century Jain monks
20th-century Indian monks
21st-century Indian Jains
21st-century Jain monks
21st-century Indian monks
Haiku poets